Avşarlar is a village in the District of Çamlıdere, Ankara Province, Turkey.

Geography
It is located 120 km from Ankara and west of Çamlıdere District. The geographic structure of the neighborhood is uneven. Therefore, its arable land is 140 hectares. The residential area of the quarter is flat. According to the records of the General Directorate of Forestry, the village is a forest district as it is covered by Article 31.

References

Villages in Çamlıdere District